Avittom Thirunal Bala Rama Varma (c. 17827 November 1810) was a ruler of the Indian princely state of Travancore from 1798 to 1810, succeeding his uncle Maharajah Dharma Raja on 12February 1798. His reign was a time of disturbances and internal and external problems. The revolt of Velu Thampi (who as Dewan negotiated the formal alliance between Travancore and the British East India Company) occurred during his rule. His great-granddaughter was the wife of Visakham Thirunal. Two ranis were adopted during the reign of Dharma Raja. They were Bharani Thirunal Parvathi Bayi and Uthram Thirunal Umayamma Bayi as the sisters of Avittom Thirunal. These princesses were the daughters of Chathayam Nal Mahaprabha Amma.

References

Bibliography

1782 births
1810 deaths
Malayali people
18th-century Indian monarchs
Hindu monarchs
Maharajas of Travancore
19th-century Indian monarchs